The 1961 Dwars door België was the 17th edition of the Dwars door Vlaanderen cycle race and was held on 29–30 April 1961. The race started and finished in Waregem.

General classification

References

1961
1961 in road cycling
1961 in Belgian sport